Numerary may refer to:

Numerary, one of the types of membership of Opus Dei
Numerary protonotary, a historical position in Roman Catholic Church
Numerary nexus, in musical tuning
Numerary system in naval flag signalling